The Liberal Party (PL) is a conservative liberal political party in Brazil. From its foundation in 2006 until 2019, it was called the Party of the Republic (PR).

The party was founded in 2006 as a merger of the 1985 Liberal Party and the Party of the Reconstruction of the National Order (PRONA), as a big tent, centre-right party, and is considered part of the Centrão, a bloc of parties without consistent ideological orientation that support different sides of the political spectrum in order to gain political privileges. In 2021, it became the base of the then-president of Brazil, Jair Bolsonaro, for the 2022 Brazilian general election. This led to many of his supporters joining the party, which thereby became the largest bloc in the National Congress of Brazil.

History 
The Party of the Republic was founded on 26 October 2006, by the merger of the old Liberal Party — which initially started as a classical liberal party, but slowly shifted towards social conservatism after it became influenced by evangelicals — and the Party of the Reconstruction of the National Order (Partido da Reedificação da Ordem Nacional, PRONA) — a far-right nationalist party. The merger was performed in order to surpass the Electoral threshold of 5%, but also as a rebranding as the Liberal Party was heavily implicated in the Mensalão scandal.

Historically the party was a pragmatic party of business interests, supporting the candidacies of Lula and Dilma from the Workers' Party (PT) for the sake of moderating their presidencies. It generally supported a form of Lulism, which had less economic regulation. As such, the Party of the Republic was considered part of the Centrão. PR's predecessor, the Liberal Party, was heavily involved in the Mensalão - a vote-buying scheme done by the Workers' Party in order to gain support in the National Congress, and Lula's Vice President José Alencar was a member of the old PL.

During the 2010 elections, the Party of the Republic focused on the parliamentary elections; it won 41 of the 513 seats in the Chamber of Deputies and 4 of the 81 Senate seats. One of PR's elected politicians was professional humorist and professional clown Tiririca, who became the State of São Paulo's most voted representative with more than one million votes, and due to Brazil's proportional voting system, Tiririca thus supported PR in electing a sizeable amount of representatives.

Sergio Victor Tamer, founder of the Party of the Republic, was the party's president from 2006 to 2014. Alfredo Nascimento succeeded Tamer as president of the PR until April 2016, when he resigned due to party leadership not supporting the impeachment of Dilma Rousseff. However, 26 of the PR's MPs did vote for her impeachment.

After that move by its MPs, the party took a more rightward turn away from its bipartisan past and supported Geraldo Alckmin's failed campaign in the 2018 Brazilian presidential election.

On 7 May 2019, the Superior Electoral Court (TSE) voted to approve a motion of the party to change its name back to Liberal Party (PL). According to party leadership, the change was done in order to return to the party's roots as body defending economic liberalism, Free market and low intervention of the state in the economy. The social positions of the party remained socially conservative, however. Other specialists point it out as part of a national tendency of parties in Brazil rebranding in order to get better perception from the electorate due a process of loss of trust caused by the Brazilian political crisis, and also riding a wave of pro-liberalism sentiment in Brazil.

On 30 November 2021, President of Brazil Jair Bolsonaro and his son Senator Flávio Bolsonaro — who were previously affiliated with the Social Liberal Party (PSL) and left it, attempting to create the Alliance for Brazil party with no avail — joined the PL in preparation for the 2022 Brazilian general election (as presidential candidates must be affiliated with a political party). He had previously considered returning to the Progressists (PP), the Social Christian Party (PSC), Brazilian Labour Party (PTB), as well negotiation with number of other smaller and/or right-wing parties. Bolsonaro's affiliation to the PL has been pointed out by analysts as a consolidation of an alliance with the Centrão.

In the 2022 general election, the party has formed a presidential ticket and many gubernatorial tickets with a hard right coalition of the Republicans and the Progressitas (PP). The election was a great success to the party, resulting on PL becoming the largest bloc in the National Congress of Brazil with 99 seats and the Federal Senate with 13 seats. According to some analysts, the party has been divided between two wide factions: one from traditional Centrão politicians loyal to party president Valdemar Costa Neto, and a Bolsonarist one, composed by about two-thirds of the PL's elected bench, coming from his followers from PSL. In an interview, Neto revealed he fears that in case Luiz Inácio Lula da Silva is elected president, there will be a split in the party as the traditional faction might want to align themselves with a possible PT government, while the Bolsonarist branch will form an opposition.

Ideology 
The Liberal Party is a big tent conservative party. The Liberal Party are described as centre-right or right-wing.

Though previously a party of national liberalism, before its merger with PRONA, the party has increasingly been affiliated with the anti-democratic right in Brazil. This has come as a result of the party's joining around the political philosophy of Jair Bolsonaro, who was initially affiliated with the PSL and other socially conservative parties. With the questioning of democracy, foreign policy, and the anti-democratic statements of Bolsonaro, the party seems to have re-embraced some of the tendencies of the head of PRONA Eneas Carneiro, a noted supporter of LaRoucheism, the previous military dictatorship, and a right wing opposition to neoliberalism.

Generally the party is right-wing populist, economically liberal, but socially anti liberal and pro-Evangelical, aligning with the ideology of Bolsonaro. The party is agrarian, pro-military, and pro-life. The party promotes a generally more economically open form of Brazilian nationalism than Carneiro. The party has frequently supported Bolsonaro's attacks on the media and the election system in Brazil.

Notable members 

 Jair Bolsonaro, former army captain, Federal Deputy for Rio de Janeiro from to 1991 to 2018, and President of Brazil from 2019 to 2022
 Flavio Bolsonaro, entrepreneur, Federal Deputy for Rio de Janeiro from 2003 to 2019, and Senator for Rio de Janeiro since 2019
 Tiririca, comedian, singer-songwriter, and Federal Deputy for São Paulo since 2011
 Romário, football player and Senator for Rio de Janeiro 
 Marco Feliciano, pastor and Federal Deputy for São Paulo since 2011
 Flávia Arruda, entrepreneur, Secretary of Government from 2021 to 2022, and Federal Deputy for the Federal District since 2019
 Valdemar Costa Neto, former Federal Deputy for São Paulo from 1991 to 2005 and from 2007 to 2013 and current Party President
 Onyx Lorenzoni, veterinarian, cabinet minister, and politician from Rio Grande do Sul

Electoral results

Presidential elections

Legislative elections

See also 
 Fiscal conservatism
 Liberty Korea Party / People Power Party (South Korea) — the country's mainstream conservative party, it gradually turned right-wing populistic
 Liberal Party of Australia — a similarly named party with a conservative position
 Liberal Democratic Party (Japan) — another similarly named party with a right-wing position
 List of political parties in Brazil

Notes

References 

2006 establishments in Brazil
Conservative liberal parties
Conservative parties in Brazil
Liberal parties in Brazil
Political parties established in 2006
Right-wing parties in South America